Harvey Anderson (born 10 October 1972) is an English first-class cricketer who played all his games for Galle Cricket Club. His highest score of 16 came when playing for Galle in the match against Colts Cricket Club.
He has also played a few non First-class games for Bradford/Leeds University Centre of Cricketing Excellence in England.

References

English cricketers
Galle Cricket Club cricketers
Living people
1972 births
British expatriates in Sri Lanka